The Bootleg of the Bootleg EP is an extended play by American rapper Jean Grae, released on October 7, 2003, by Babygrande Records. It was recorded at Building Block Studio, The Bar Upstairs, and The BK FireHouse in New York City.

Critical reception 

Allmusic's Andy Kellman felt that, despite the "weak spot" "Swing Blades" and a 45-minute hidden track of freestyles and "stray material", the EP's strong textures and soul samples suit "Grae's tough, agile, nothing-fancy flow." Michael Endelman of Entertainment Weekly praised Grae's "long strings of witty disses and unflinching self-analysis", and wrote that she has "skills to spare." Del F. Cowie of Exclaim! found her "cast-offs" to be better than most other rappers' "Grade A material" and asserted that "Grae has not only maintained her profile but has a made a strong case to be considered one of the most versatile MCs around." Robert Christgau of The Village Voice found the EP "looser in theme and execution, and also better than" her debut album, and wrote of Grae's change:

J. Victoria Sanders of PopMatters said that, although "it’s clear she's not afraid of being a maverick or holding her own on the mic", Grae is held back by her "monotone delivery" and, "even with a seamless style, it can be hard not to get distracted from her soft, linear rhyme slipping."

Track listing
 "Hater's Anthem" – 5:13
 "Take Me" – 3:36 
 "Swing Blades" (featuring Cannibal Ox) – 2:28
 "My Crew" – 5:23 
 "Code Red" (featuring Block McCloud and Pumpkinhead) – 3:51 
 "Chapter One: Destiny" – 45:09 
 "Breathe Easy"
Samples beat from "Lyrical Exercise" by Jay-Z
 "A Little Story"
Samples beat from "Day One" by D.I.T.C.
 "You Don't Want It"
Samples beat from "Role Model" by Eminem
 "Excuse Me Sir"
Samples beat from "Excuse Me Miss" by Jay-Z
 "High"
Samples beat from "Purple" by Nas
 "Keep Livin"
Samples beat from "On My Block" by Scarface 
 "You Don't Know"
Samples beat from "U Don't Know" by Jay-Z
 "Bum Deal"
Featuring Natural Resource
 "Negro Baseball League"
Featuring Natural Resource
 "Dichotomy"
Featuring Pumpkinhead
 "Spittin' Bars"
Featuring Bad Seed and Pumpkinhead

Personnel 
Credits adapted from Allmusic.

 Cannibal Ox – featured artist
 Jeff Chenault – design
 Dave Dar – mixing
 W. Eugene Davis – composer
 Zvi Edelman – A&R
 Jean Grae – primary artist
 T.J. Graham – composer
 Charles "Chase" Jones – promoter
 Emily Lazar – mastering
 Block McCloud –  featured artist, mixing, producer
 Pumpkinhead – featured artist
 Sarah Register – assistant mastering engineer
 Ruddy Rock –  A&R, executive producer, producer
 Jesse Stone – marketing
 William Tell – producer
 Chuck Wilson – executive producer

References

External links 
 

2003 EPs
Jean Grae albums
Babygrande Records EPs